Emmanuel Nkurunziza is a Rwandan former cyclist. He competed in the individual road race at the 1992 Summer Olympics.

References

Year of birth missing (living people)
Living people
Rwandan male cyclists
Olympic cyclists of Rwanda
Cyclists at the 1992 Summer Olympics
Place of birth missing (living people)